Port Lincoln Prison is an Australian prison on the Eyre Peninsula located in Duck Ponds, South Australia about  west of the state capital of Adelaide and about  north-west of the regional city of Port Lincoln. It was opened in 1966.

Sheep and cattle are raised at the prison providing work for low security prisoners involved in running an agricultural business. It has a capacity of 90 prisoners.

References

External links
 Port Lincoln Prison

Prisons in South Australia
Eyre Peninsula